Dumbarton House School was a co-educational independent school located in Swansea, Wales in south Wales. The school opened in 1923 and closed in 1993. The buildings were demolished to make way for a new block of flats.

Notable former pupils

 Rob Brydon, comedian
 Ben Pickering, filmmaker and novelist
 Catherine Zeta-Jones, actress

References

Defunct schools in Swansea
Educational institutions established in 1923
Educational institutions disestablished in 1993
1923 establishments in Wales